Berovo Lake is a freshwater lake located in the Republic of North Macedonia.

The lake lies within 7 km of the North Macedonia-Bulgaria Border, near the town of Berovo. The lake is surrounded by evergreen and deciduous type species of forests. Many locals go swimming, fishing, or sailing in the lake. The forested areas that surround the lake are protected by the Macedonian Forestry Police. Illegal cutting down forested areas for fire is prohibited in most areas of the country.

References

Lakes of North Macedonia
Berovo Municipality